The 1864 United States presidential election in Wisconsin was held on November 8, 1864 as part of the 1864 United States presidential election. State voters chose eight electors to the Electoral College, who voted for president and vice president.

National Union Party candidate and incumbent President Abraham Lincoln won Wisconsin with 55.88 percent of the popular vote, winning the state's eight electoral votes.

Results

See also
 United States presidential elections in Wisconsin

References

Wisconsin
1864 Wisconsin elections
1864